Aimee Phan is a Vietnamese-American author. She was born and raised in Orange County, California. She received her BA in English from UCLA and her MFA from the Iowa Writers' Workshop, where she won a Maytag Fellowship. Her first novel, We Should Never Meet, was named a Notable Book by the Kiriyama Prize in fiction and a finalist for the 2005 Asian American Literary Awards. Her writing has appeared in The New York Times, Virginia Quarterly Review, USA Today and The Oregonian among other publications. She has received residencies from the MacDowell Colony, Hedgebrook and the Rockefeller Foundation's Bellagio Center. She worked as an assistant professor in English at Washington State University from fall 2005 to summer 2007, and now teaches as an associate professor in writing and literature at the California College of the Arts in San Francisco, California and resides in Berkeley, California with her husband and two kids.

Selected works 
Books
We Should Never Meet: Stories
 The Reeducation of Cherry Truong: A Novel

Essays
 Why Mainstream Critics Fail Writers of Color in Salon
 The Price of Urban Family Living in The New York Times' The Motherlode
 Housed in Guernica
 The Disciples of Memory in The Rumpus
 Where They Came From in The New York Times

Awards and honors 
 2004 Association of Asian American Studies Book Award
 Finalist for the 2005 Asian American Literary Awards in Fiction
 2005 Kiriyama Prize Notable Book
 2010 National Endowment of the Arts Creative Writing Fellowship
 2014 Rockefeller Foundation Bellagio Center Residency

Reviews 
 Carmela Ciuraru, September 29, 2004, We Should Never Meet by Aimee Phan, The Los Angeles Times
 Anhoni Patel, September 19, 2004, We Should Never Meet by Aimee Phan, San Francisco Chronicle
 Jee Yoon Lee, May 10, 2012 The Reeducation of Cherry Truong by Aimee Phan in Hyphen Magazine
 Susan M. Lee, March 8, 2012 The Reeducation of Cherry Truong by Aimee Phan in In the Fray Magazine

External links
 Official website
 We Should Never Meet
 Someone You’d Love to Meet

Year of birth missing (living people)
Living people
Iowa Writers' Workshop alumni
American writers of Vietnamese descent
American women novelists
21st-century American novelists
Writers from California
21st-century American women writers
Vietnamese writers
Vietnamese women writers
English-language literature of Vietnam